Potok (Rus. Flow) is a Russian investment and development company with the head-office in Moscow. Its activities include mixed-use development, construction, managing and selling of real estate in Moscow and abroad. The projects, which were previously under the control of the Mirax Group corporation, now are being developed by this brand.

Owners and management 

Potok was founded on December 1, 2011, by Sergei Polonsky, and this company has inherited all the structures and liabilities of Nazvanie.net (former Mirax Group). As reported earlier, the Mirax Group brand was officially closed on 3 March 2011, at a special press-conference for media representatives, who received the official statement of the Board of Directors of the investment and development company MIRAX GROUP. It stated that all the obligations of the group on completion of the objects would certainly be fulfilled. All public debt сommitments of the group (denominated bonds, CLNs and LPNs), said the statement, would also be honored in full accordance with the terms of restructuring.

On December 1, 2011, Sergei Polonsky officially changed the name of the company to Potok, with all the obligations and structures of Nazvanie.net to be retained by the new company.

The controlling interest of Potok belongs to its founder, chairman of the board of directors, Sergei Polonsky.

In July 2012, the restructuring of the public debt of the Potok company (ex-MIRAX GROUP) was successfully completed. It took the company one and a half years to prepare this deal together with the debt restructuring agent, OAO Alfa-Bank and a working group of creditors. The restructuring included the exchange of the five existing at the time security issues – three ruble bond issues and two English law note issues – for the new issue of notes (LPN2019) with the face value of RUR14.5 billion. As collateral for this transaction, 8 projects and a personal guarantee of the Potok shareholder Sergei Polonsky were used. For investors who can not own the notes for certain reasons, new ruble bonds worth RUR1 billion were issued.

Activity 

Potok operates in the real estate markets of Russia, Ukraine, France, Cambodia, Malaysia, Montenegro, United States, Switzerland and Beetham Tower in United Kingdom. In May 2011, the company's portfolio included several projects with a total area of about ten million sq.m.

Potok is the client and developer of the future tallest building in Eastern Europe, business complex Federation Tower, which is currently under construction in the Moscow International Business Center – "Moskva City". In May 2011, Sberbank of Russia allowed a credit of $373.6 mln for the completion of the tower construction.

As a result of certain restructuring, a new scheme of project management was implemented, in which the management triad, composed of the CEOs and top managers of the company, shall carry out all the construction works on each project of the company operational program and, therefore, bear full responsibility for the result.

The structures of Potok also comprise several companies previously engaged in separate and distinct types of business. Among them are Stolitsa-Service (engaged in the management and operation of the commissioned buildings), ex-Mirax-Pharma (research, production and retail of pharmaceutical products), ex-Mirax-Design (design and fulfillment of interiors), and others.

Foreign projects 

It is worth noting that the foreign projects in the UK, Switzerland, the US, Montenegro, Cambodia, Malaysia, Ukraine were not launched by the Potok group of companies and are personal projects of shareholders.

Success in Switzerland. In the summer of 2012, the company received permission to build the first phase of the ski resort project LE VILLAGE ROYAL in the canton of Valais. One of the company's main tasks in the construction in the area is the preservation and maintenance of the natural environment. Potok is going to invest 260 million Swiss francs in the ecology of this region. During the construction of the resort, builders will follow the traditional Swiss towers-and-chalet style and give priority to the use of natural building materials: wood, stone, natural roofing materials, as well as solar energy. The entire project is certified by the Swiss Minerzhi environmental standard.

London Project. In December 2011, due to the wrongful acts of the Royal Bank of Scotland, the former project administrators BDO and CBRIS dealers, the company shareholders lost one of the best and profitable overseas projects – BEETHAM TOWER. The project was recognized by the bank as economically irrational, taken away and sold for a pittance to a rival company, St. George. The new owner of the project, the CEO of St. George, Mr. Pinchli, expects a profit of at least £500 million from the project. The company shareholders are going to contest the confiscation of the Potok project in court.

Another project in London, Cornwall Terrace, is dedicated to reconstruction of a part of the 16th-century architectural ensemble in Regent's Park. It is being implemented in cooperation with partner, Oakmayne Group.
In 2008–10, despite the difficulties caused by the global financial crisis, the company managed to maintain independence and control over the project to come to a constructive dialogue with co-investors and to put several apartment complexes into operation.

At the moment, the financial situation of the company is stable. All loans are serviced on time. Moreover, in 2012, the company successfully completed the restructuring of the public debt in the amount of 12.8 billion rubles. As of September 2012, the total debt is estimated at 16.4 billion rubles.

References

External links 

 

Construction and civil engineering companies of Russia
Companies based in Moscow
Construction and civil engineering companies established in 2011
Russian companies established in 2011